Brachypalpus longifacies is a species of hoverfly in the family Syrphidae.

Distribution
Russia.

References

Eristalinae
Insects described in 2019
Diptera of Asia